The 2015–16 Iona Gaels men's basketball team represented Iona College during the 2015–16 NCAA Division I men's basketball season. The Gaels, led by sixth year head coach Tim Cluess, played their home games at the Hynes Athletic Center and were members of the Metro Atlantic Athletic Conference (MAAC). They finished the season 22–11, 16–4 in MAAC play to finish in second place. They defeated Canisius, Siena, and Monmouth to be champions of the MAAC tournament and earn the conference's automatic bid to the NCAA tournament where, as a #13 seed, they lost in the first round to Iowa State.

Previous season 
The Gaels finished the 2014–15 season 26–9, 17–3 in MAAC play to win the MAAC regular season championship. Iona lost to Manhattan in the championship game of the MAAC tournament and earned an automatic bid to the National Invitation Tournament. In the NIT, they lost in the first round to Rhode Island.

Roster

Schedule

|-
!colspan=9 style="background:#990033; color:#FFCC00;"| Regular season

|-
!colspan=9 style="background:#990033; color:#FFCC00;"|MAAC tournament

|-
!colspan=9 style="background:#990033; color:#FFCC00;"|NCAA tournament

References

Iona Gaels men's basketball seasons
Iona
Iona